De første og Største hits is a compilation album by the Danish singer Anne Gadegaard. It was released in 2006 and as with Anne Gadegaard's previous studio albums, it was not released in the UK or the US. The title translates as "The First and Greatest hits". The album reached #10 on the Danish album charts and #29 on the Norwegian album charts. This compilation album contains two bonus tracks, "Shoo Bi Doo" and "Gi Mig Alt".

Track listing
(Titles in brackets are for rough translation purposes only)
Arabiens Drøm (Arabian Dream)
Louis
Choco Og Nugga (Chocolate and Nougat)
Prinsesserne På Is (Princess On Ice)
Ini Mini Miny Moe
Måneblomst (Moon Flower)
Skolefri (School is Free)
Ligesom En Drøm (Like a Dream)
Angel
Chiki Chiki
Du Er Ikke Alene Mere (You are Not Alone Anymore)
Vamonos
Kan Du Mærke Beatet (Can You Feel The Beat)
Ønsketræet (Wish Tree)
MGP Sangen (MGP Song)
Kærester (Boyfriends)
Dub I Dub (Dub In Dub)
Gi Mig Alt (Give Me Everything)
Shoo Bi Doo

Skolefri means school is free from boundaries, as opposed to being without charge.

Chart performance

Weekly charts

Release history

References

Anne Gadegaard compilation albums
2006 greatest hits albums
Danish-language compilation albums